The 1899 Mississippi gubernatorial election took place on November 7, 1899, in order to elect the Governor of Mississippi. Incumbent Democrat Anselm J. McLaurin was term-limited, and could not run for reelection to a second term.

Democratic primary

General election
In the general election, Democratic candidate Andrew H. Longino, a former state senator, easily defeated Populist candidate R. K. Prewitt.

Results

References

1899
gubernatorial
Mississippi
November 1899 events